Sadko is a Russian mythical hero.

Sadko may also refer to:
Sadko (musical tableau), an 1867 symphonic poem by Nikolai Rimsky-Korsakov
Sadko (painting), an 1876 painting by Ilya Repin
Sadko (opera), an 1896 opera by Rimsky-Korsakov
Sadko (film), a 1953 film by Aleksandr Ptushko
Sadko (icebreaker), a Russian icebreaker built in 1912
Sadko (submarine), a Russian civilian submarine built in 1997
GAZ Sadko, a Russian-built cargo truck
Matisse & Sadko, a Russian Music Group.